Linden railway station may refer to:

 Linden railway station, New South Wales, on the Main Western line in Australia
 Linden railway station, Wellington, on the North Island Main Trunk Railway (NIMT) in Wellington, New Zealand
 Linden station (CTA), an 'L' station on the Purple Line in Wilmette, Illinois, United States
 Linden station (NJ Transit), on the Northeast Corridor in Linden, New Jersey, United States